Barsanuphius (died c. 545), also known as Barsanuphius of Palestine, Barsanuphius of Gaza or Barsanuphius the Great (in Eastern Orthodoxy), was a Christian hermit and writer of the sixth century.

Born in Egypt, he lived in absolute seclusion for fifty years, and then near the monastery of Saint Seridon of Gaza in Palestine. He wrote many letters, 800 of which have survived. He corresponded mainly with John the Prophet, abbot of the monastery of Merosala and teacher of Dorotheus of Gaza.

At the old age he convinced the emperor to renew the concordant relationship with the Church of Jerusalem.

Veneration
His relics arrived in Oria, in Italy, with a Palestinian monk in 850 AD and placed in the present-day church of San Francesco da Paola by Bishop Theodosius. During a Moorish siege and taking of the city, the relics were lost but then later rediscovered and placed in the city's basilica.

At Oria he is considered to have saved the city from destruction wrought by foreign invaders. A legend states that he repelled a Spanish invasion by appearing before the Spanish commander armed with a sword. During World War II, he is said to have spread his blue cape across the sky, thus causing a rainstorm, and preventing an air bombing by Allied Forces.

References

External links
 San Barsanofio

6th-century Christian saints
Eastern Orthodox saints
Egyptian hermits
Saints from the Holy Land
Saints from Roman Egypt
563 deaths
Year of birth unknown